Ras Midas (born 1958, Clarendon Parish, Jamaica) is a reggae artist and member of the Rastafari movement most famous for his album Rastaman in Exile. At age 13, he moved to the United Kingdom. He began his career in music in 1968, and later enjoyed popularity with reggae audiences in France, before relocating to the United States. He now lives in Jacksonville, Florida.

Discography
Kudea-A-Bamba (1978), Island/Harry J
Rain & Fire (1979), Island/Harry J
Rastaman In Exile (1980), SKEJ/Disc AZ
Stand Up Wise Up (1984), Celluloid
Loving Vibration (1996), Worldwide
Confirmation (2000), JML
Reaching Out (2008), White Eagle
Fire Up (2010), JML

References

External links
Website
Ras Midas Video clips
"Cultural Fiesta" – interview with Ras Midas by Peter I, reggae-vibes.com

1958 births
Living people
Jamaican Rastafarians
Jamaican reggae musicians
People from Clarendon Parish, Jamaica
Jamaican emigrants to the United Kingdom
Jamaican emigrants to the United States